John Coit may refer to:
 John J. Coit, American railroad engineer,
 John Eliot Coit, American professor specializing in the horticultural fields of avocado, citrus and carob

See also
 John Coit Spooner, politician and lawyer from Wisconsin